Tears Of Martyr is a Spanish symphonic metal band from Las Palmas. The band was formed in 1996. Their latest album Tales was released with Massacre Records on April 26, 2013.

History 
The band was formed in 1996 in Las Palmas, Spain. In 1996 they released their first demo album The Essence of Evil. After a long years of silence comes out their second demo Renascence (2005). In 2007 band moved to Madrid. In June 2009, they released their first full-length album Entrance. Later that year lead singer Berenice Musa won Metal Female Awards 2009 in the category of best Spanish metal band singer.

In August 2012 the band entered New Sin Studio (Italy) where they have recorded and mastered their second full-length album Tales produced by Enrik García (Dark Moor). The album was released with Massacre Records on April 26, 2013.

Members 
Current line-up
Berenice Musa – soprano
Miguel Angel Marqués – guitars and vocals
Adrián Miranda – bass
Doramas Párraga – drums

Former members
Armando J. Álvarez – vocals, bass
Javier Montesdeoca – guitar
Oscar Morante – guitar
Yeray Corujo – keyboard

Discography 
Demo
 The Essence of Evil (1996)
 Renascence (2005)

Albums
 Entrance (2009)
 Tales (2013)

Singles 

 Eyes To See, Heart To Feel (2002)
 Ancient Pine Awaits II (2019)

References

External links 
 
 
 

Spanish symphonic metal musical groups
Musical groups established in 1996
1996 establishments in Spain
Spanish gothic metal musical groups